The Transport Act 1983 (the Act) was the main statute establishing government transport organisations and regulating land transport activities in the State of Victoria, Australia for 27 years from mid-1983 to mid-2010.  The Act was used as the vehicle for changes to transport organisational arrangements and transport regulation activities pursued by Victorian governments over that period.

The Transport Act received the royal assent on 23 June 1983 and commenced on 1 July of that year.  The Act remained as Victoria's principal transport statute until mid-2010 when that position was taken by a new statute, the Transport Integration Act 2010.  It was renamed as the Transport (Compliance and Miscellaneous) Act 1983, a title which it retains to this day.

Initial purpose

Organisational reforms 
The Transport Act was initially passed by the Victorian Parliament as a major reform measure particularly in relation to institutional arrangements in the transport portfolio.  The Act abolished a range of long established transport agencies including the Victorian Railways, the Melbourne and Metropolitan Tramways Board and the Country Roads Board.  In their place a range of new organisations including the State Transport Authority, the Metropolitan Transit Authority, the Road Construction Authority and the Road Traffic Authority were established.  The Transport Act also established the Ministry of Transport as the prime coordinating agency for transport in Victoria.

Transport regulation 
The Transport Act also consolidated much of the suite of Victorian land transport statutes containing regulatory controls. The Act initially contained a suite of provisions affecting trains and trams, buses, taxis and hire cars and tow trucks.  Few of these provisions remain today in the Transport (Compliance and Miscellaneous) Act.  The main schemes which remain relate to taxi and hire car regulation, the only substantial area of Victorian transport regulation not to be contained in a discrete statute, and provisions relating to compliance and enforcement in safety areas and affecting public transport ticketing and conduct.

Later developments 
The major organisational changes brought about by the Transport Act were themselves the subject of major changes in the period after 1983.

1989 organisational consolidation 

In 1989, the Victorian Parliament passed a new statute, the Transport (Amendment) Act, which made major adjustments to the initial organisational changes made by the Transport Act in 1983.  The new Act merged the State Transport Authority and the Metropolitan Transit Authority to establish a new organisation, the Public Transport Corporation, to manage train, tram and bus operations in metropolitan and regional areas of Victoria.  The Transport (Amendment) Act also merged the Road Construction Authority and the Road Traffic Authority to create the Roads Corporation or VicRoads to manage the State's road network and its vehicle licensing and registration systems.  The mergers took effect on 1 July 1989.

Other organisational changes 

Other major organisational changes occurred after 1989 including the establishment of the office of the Director of Public Transport and the abolition of the Public Transport Corporation as well as the creation of discrete and special purpose organisations such as VicTrack and V/Line.

Regulatory developments 

Many of the regulatory consolidations effected by the Transport Act have been reversed since the Act was initially passed. In many cases, the Victorian Parliament has acted to pass new principal statutes for subject matters previously regulated by the Transport Act, for example:

 Public Transport Competition Act 1995 (since renamed the Bus Services Act 1995)
 Rail Corporations Act 1996
 Rail Safety Act 2006
 Accident Towing Services Act 2007
 Bus Safety Act 2009, and
 Tourist and Heritage Railways Act 2010.

The Transport Integration Act 2010 

In early 2010, the Victorian Parliament passed a major new transport statute, the Transport Integration Act, which came into force on 1 July of that year.  The new act superseded the Transport Act as Victoria's main transport statute and, at the same time, it extended the ambit of the legislation beyond land transport activities to cover ports and marine services.

Transfer of organisations 
All Victorian transport organisations created by statute have been transferred to the Transport Integration Act including the land transport agencies previously established and empowered by the Transport Act.

Change of name of Transport Act 

The Transport Integration Act changed the name of the Transport Act 1983 to the Transport (Compliance and Miscellaneous) Act 1983.   The name change took effect on 1 July 2010.

See also 

 Transport Integration Act
 Transport (Compliance and Miscellaneous) Act 1983

References 

Transport in Victoria (Australia)
Victoria (Australia) legislation
Transport law in Australia
1983 in Australian law
1980s in Victoria (Australia)
History of transport in Victoria (Australia)
1983 in transport
Transport legislation